The autostrada A1, officially named Amber Highway in Poland is a north–south motorway that runs through central Poland, from Gdańsk (on the Baltic Sea) through Łódź and the Upper Silesian Industry Area (to the west of Katowice) to the Polish-Czech border in Gorzyczki/Věřňovice, where it is connected with the Czech motorway D1.  Except for its southernmost section, the motorway is a part of European route E75.

The section from Gdańsk to Toruń is tolled (see Tolls).

History of construction

The construction of the A1 motorway has been a highly politicized issue in Poland, as it is perceived to be an economically vital road that would connect the country's major ports on the Baltic coast with both central and southern Poland. One short fragment (17 km) was constructed in years 1978 – 1989, one of the first motorway stretches built under communist regime. Since 1989 various governments and political parties have supported an accelerated construction schedule for this motorway, without results.

After many delays, caused mainly by lack of funding, construction started in 2005. The main part of the motorway was constructed in years 2005 – 2014: about 395 km (70% of the route's length) have been built within this period. By July 2016 (when a delayed Łódź bypass section was finished), the route has been completed except for those sections where the old national road 1 had already been a dual carriageway, allowing for a significantly lower priority of constructing a motorway on this remaining stretch compared to construction of other highways.

The section from Częstochowa to Pyrzowice was constructed in years 2016 – 2020. The remaining section from Tuszyn to Częstochowa was constructed in years 2019 – 2022, which also included an upgrade of the 17 km long pre-1989 stretch.

Gdańsk to Stryków
This section was built in stages between 2005 and 2014. First, a  section was opened on 22 December 2007, near Gdańsk, extending the S6 bypass expressway, and a remaining  opened on 17 October 2008. The 62 km extension of the motorway to Toruń opened on 14 October 2011. Missing Włocławek-Kowal section was completed in April 2014.

Stryków to Pyrzowice
The oldest section of this segment, a  stretch as the Piotrków Trybunalski bypass, was built between 1978 and 1989.  This was one of the very few stretches of motorway built in Poland under the Communist regime. In addition, the section from Częstochowa to Piotrków Trybunalski was built in the 1970s as a dual carriageway road on a motorway alignment. However, it lacked motorway interchanges, and instead had standard intersections with no grade separation, regulated by traffic lights.

On 22 January 2009 a contract was signed for the construction of the  section from Stryków (junction with motorway A2) to Pyrzowice.  Under the terms of the contract, the segment from Stryków to Częstochowa was to be finished by May 2012, while the remaining segment from Częstochowa to Pyrzowice was to be finished by January 2014 (60 months after the signing of the contract).  The motorway was to be built within a Private-Public Partnership framework by company Autostrada Południe.  The contract included the rebuilding of an already existing stretch of A1 motorway (opened in 1989) as well as the upgrade of the existing dual-carriageway road between Piotrków Trybunalski and Częstochowa.  On 23 January 2010 the contract was cancelled as the company was not able to secure financing.  It carried out the design project of the motorway however, which according to the Polish government was to make it possible for construction to begin in 2010 by new contractors, and be finished by 2012. However, the design project turned out to be full of flaws and needed to be redone.

The section from Łódź Północ interchange to Tuszyn interchange was opened in 2016. The section from Pyrzowice to Częstochowa began construction in 2016, and was finished in 2020. Reconstruction of the remaining dual-carriageway stretch from Częstochowa to Piotrków Trybunalski began in 2019 adn finished in 2022.

Pyrzowice to border with Czech Republic 

At the southern end of the motorway, construction of a  section from Gliwice-Sośnica to Bełk, part of the southernmost section from the junction with the A4 motorway at Sośnica district of Gliwice to the Czech border, began on 26 March 2007 and was completed in December 2009. Construction of the  section from Pyrzowice to Gliwice-Sośnica began in 2009 and was fully completed by June 2012. The section from Pyrzowice to Piekary Śląskie has quickly deteriorated into very poor condition due to the materials used for its foundation, and is planned to be repaired.

On 15 December 2009 the Polish government announced the cancelling of the contract for building the Świerklany - Gorzyczki (Czech border) section, citing the unacceptably slow pace of construction by Alpine Bau GmbH.  The government solicited new bids for this section in April 2010 and the bid was won by the same company that lost the original contract, and construction resumed in October 2010.  The original plan was for the road to be ready in the Summer of 2010, and according to the new contract it was to be ready in April 2012, in time for Euro 2012 championships. Alpine Bau GmbH abandoned their second effort to finish this section in May 2013. It was finally opened in May 2014.

Sections of the motorway

Exit list

See also
European route E75

References

External links

Official website of Gdańsk-Toruń section operator 
 Official page for construction project A1 Kowal-Stryków 
 Official page for construction project A1 Stryków-Tuszyn 
 Official page for construction project A1 Pyrzowice-Gliwice Sośnica 
 Official page for construction project A1 Rząsawa - Blachownia 
 Official page for construction project A1 Blachownia-Zawodzie 
 Official page for construction project A1 Zawodzie - Woźniki 
 Official page for construction project A1 Woźniki - Pyrzowice 

Motorways in Poland
Proposed roads in Poland